The Tuscumbia Female Academy was a school for women in Tuscumbia, Alabama which operated from 1826 until the 1860s.  The Tuscumbia Female Academy was one of the oldest schools for women established in Alabama.  The academy was chartered by the state of Alabama on January 13, 1826, and rechartered in 1832.  The school operated until the 1860s when it was closed due to the American Civil War.  After its closing, the buildings of the school were used by the public schools of Tuscumbia.

See also
 Female seminary

References

Educational institutions established in 1826
Female seminaries in the United States
Defunct schools in Alabama
Education in Colbert County, Alabama
History of women in Alabama
1826 establishments in Alabama